Part Seven (Part VII) of the Constitution of Albania is the seventh of eighteen parts. Titled Normative Acts and International Agreements, it is divided into 2 chapters that consist of 8 articles.

The Assembly 
Chapter I: Normative Acts

Chapter II: International Agreements

References

7